Chris Cox is an American horse trainer. Cox has won the Road to the Horse competition four times and gives clinics in the United States.

Life

Cox was born in Kissimmee, Florida and moved to Australia with his family at age one. In Australia he lived on a large cattle ranch, before returning to America as an adult. Cox now lives on a ranch near Mineral Wells, Texas.

Career

Cox began training horses at age 7. As an adult, he has trained mustangs for the Bureau of Land Management. He gives clinics in the United States and has competed in cutting horse competitions. He has won Road to the Horse four times, making him the only trainer to do so. The Texas Cowboy Hall of Fame inducted him in 2015.

References

American horse trainers